Brian Hart Ltd., also known as Hart and Hart Racing Engines, was a motor racing engine manufacturer that participated in 157 Formula One Grands Prix, powering a total of 368 entries.

Founded in 1969 by British engineer Brian Hart, Hart initially concentrated on servicing and tuning engines from other manufacturers for various independent British teams at all levels of motorsport. Hart found particular success with developments of Ford's FVA engine, eventually leading the large multinational company to approach the small independent to develop the Ford BDA 1.6 L engine for the 2.0L class. The European Formula Two title was won in both 1971 and 1972 with Hart-built Ford engines, and the 2.0 L BDA engine powered the majority of Ford's 1970s rallying successes.

With Ford's withdrawal from F2 in the mid-1970s, Hart began to concentrate on building their own designs. The first engine to bear the Hart name alone was the twin-cam, four-cylinder Hart 420R F2 unit, which appeared in 1976 and powered race-winning cars until the end of the decade. In 1978, the Toleman team agreed to a partnership program, with Toleman providing finance to develop further Hart engine designs. The fruits of this collaboration resulted in Toleman taking a one-two finish in the 1980 European F2 Championship.

For 1981 Hart followed Toleman into Formula One, with an inline four-cylinder 1.5 L turbo engine named the 415T. However, the year was a disaster, with Brian Hart's small operation failing to keep pace with better-funded outfits. Toleman cars only qualified to race twice. Hart persisted though, with the best result from the five-year relationship with Toleman coming when Ayrton Senna took second place at the 1984 Monaco Grand Prix and Toleman claiming 7th in the  Constructors Championship. Teo Fabi also took pole position in a Toleman-Hart at the 1985 German Grand Prix, the first of only two F1 poles by a Hart-powered car.

During this period, Hart turbos were used by three other teams – RAM (1984–85); Spirit (1984–85); and the Haas Lola team (1985–86). While none of their teams performed that well, Hart gained a reputation for excellent work on a small budget.

After 1984 companies like Renault, Honda, BMW, TAG-Porsche, and Ferrari were able to develop their engines to receive much higher turbo boost than the Hart 415T. This resulted in Brian Hart stopping development of the engine. The last time it was used was by the Haas Lola team at the 1986 San Marino Grand Prix, with Patrick Tambay qualifying 11th but retiring with engine troubles after just five laps.

At its peak in 1986, the Hart 415T produced a reported  at 11,000 rpm.

Following this and the outlawing of turbocharged engines in Formula One after the  season, Hart did freelance work.

Hart returned with an in-house 3.5 L V10 in  named the 1035, signing a two-year deal with the Jordan team. This culminated in a successful 1994 season, with Rubens Barrichello finishing third at the Pacific Grand Prix and taking the engine company's last F1 pole position at the Belgian Grand Prix.

For , these engines were taken over by the Minardi team, while Brian Hart himself designed a new V10 engine, the 1030, although the funds to build it were not available.

Later that year, Tom Walkinshaw Racing (TWR) bought out Brian Hart Ltd., and merged it into their Arrows Formula One team. The 1030 V10 was built and raced in 1998–1999 as the Arrows T2-F1 V10, with Mika Salo taking a fourth place at the 1998 Monaco Grand Prix. Frustrated with the lack of development, Brian Hart left Arrows.

Complete Formula One World Championship results
(key) (Races in bold indicate pole position) (Races in italics indicate fastest lap)

References

External links
Brian Hart and his engines at grandprix.com (pg. 5)

Hart
Engine manufacturers of the United Kingdom